Parenti serpenti (also known as Dearest Relatives, Poisonous Relations) is a 1992 Italian black comedy film written and directed by Mario Monicelli. It won the Italian film critics Silver Ribbon for  Best Costumes.

Plot 

An old couple invite all their children and grandchildren to their home in Sulmona, in Abruzzo, to celebrate the Christmas holidays. After a day spent at church and playing bingo at home, the grandmother asks her two daughters and two sons to decide amongst themselves which of them will take her and her husband to live with them, now that they are getting old. Their children are initially pleased to hear that their parents want to see more of them, but no one wants to take on the responsibility of having them move into their home...

Cast 
 Marina Confalone: Lina
 Alessandro Haber: Alfredo
 Tommaso Bianco: Michele
 Cinzia Leone: Gina
 Eugenio Masciari: Alessandro
 Renato Cecchetto: Filippo
 Pia Velsi: Grandmother Trieste
 Paolo Panelli: Grandfather Saverio
 Monica Scattini: Milena
 Nicoletta Orsomando

See also   
 List of Italian films of 1992

References

External links

1992 films
Commedia all'italiana
Films directed by Mario Monicelli
Italian black comedy films
1990s black comedy films
Films about families
Films shot in Abruzzo
Films with screenplays by Suso Cecchi d'Amico
1992 comedy films
1990s Italian films
1990s Italian-language films